Mob Rule is a PC game released in 1999 by Simon & Schuster and Studio 3.

Mob Rule may also refer to:
Mob rule or ochlocracy, a government by mob or a mass of people
Mob Rule, a Flash enemy in DC Comics

See also
Mafia
Mob Rules (disambiguation)